Concor Holdings (Proprietary) Limited. is a South African construction and mining services company. It is active throughout Southern Africa, involved in mining, civil engineering, building and road projects. Concor returned as an independent brand in late 2016.

Company history

Origin
Dr F. Piccini, the original founder of Construction Corporation, registered the company in Johannesburg on 28 April 1948. The other four founding members were M. Barnabo, B. Chiozzi, U. Mantelli and V. Cini. The original name Construction Corporation was finally shortened to CONCOR. Dr Piccinni was originally a chairman of Ferrocemento, an Italian construction giant and the emerging Concor received its technical support initially from there.

Initial projects
The company's first major project was the construction of the Rand Sports Stadium in Johannesburg followed by contracts for the Pretoria and Johannesburg power stations. Another initial project was the Storms River bridge which was designed by Dr. Riccardo Morandi of Rome, this bridge was for many years the highest and longest single span bridge in South Africa.

Structure
By the early 2000s, Concor consisted of the following divisions:

Concor Buildings, 
Concor Civils, 
Concor Mining, 
Concor Engineering, 2010: Fabricated the tallest tank in southern hemisphere commissioned for Sasol Secunda at its Benzene Reduction Project, standing at 47.54m.
Concor Technicrete, 
Concor Facility Management, 
Concor Property Development and 
Concor Roads.
Concor was listed on the JSE Securities Exchange and, for the year ended June 2005, Concor's last year as a listed company, had an annual turnover of 1.6 billion Rand.

Relationship with Hochtief
By the early 2000s, the German international construction group Hochtief owned just under 50% of Concors shares providing the company with the benefits of technology transfer.

Purchased by Murray & Roberts
Concor Holdings was delisted on 30 June 2006 when 100% of its share capital was purchased by Murray & Roberts. It changed its name when it merged with Murray and Roberts Construction (Pty) Ltd. Whilst under the control of Murray & Roberts, Concor Facility Management and Concor Property Development was closed whilst Concor Roads was merged with Concor Civils. Concor Technicrete was sold as a going concern.

Purchased by Southern Palace Group Consortium

The Concor and Murray and Roberts construction divisions were sold to a black owned consortium, led by Southern Palace Group in late 2016 and renamed Concor Construction in May 2017. Concor is now certified a Level 1 BEE Company.

Current operating divisions in the Group

 Concor Infrastructure (Roads, bridges, waste water systems, dams, harbours, pipelines, power stations)
 Concor Buildings (Industrial, commercial, residential and office buildings)
 Concor Western Cape (Industrial, commercial, residential and office buildings)
 Concor Botswana (Industrial, commercial and office buildings)
 Concor Opencast (Contract mining)
 Concor Plant (Heavy plant maintenance and hire) 
 Concor Developments
 Dynamic Concrete Namibia

Timeline of notable construction projects
Some of Concors' projects include:

1950s
 1952: High Level Reservoir, VanderbiljPark, South Africa.
 1952: Vals River Bridge, Bothaville, South Africa.
 1953: Sand River Bridge, Virginia, South Africa.
 1953–1956: Storms River Bridge, Eastern Cape, South Africa.

 1954: Orlando Power Station, Johannesburg, South Africa.
 1954: Salt River Bridge, Cape Town, South Africa.
 1954: Railway Bridge over Sand River, Virginia, South Africa.
 1955: Taaiboshspruit Bridge, South Africa.
 1955: Natalspruit Bridge, South Africa.
 1955: Railway Bridge over Great Fish River, South Africa.
 1956: Vetrivier Bridge, South Africa.
 1957: Pipeline and Jetty, Lourenco Marques, Mozambique.
 1958: Umsindusi River Bridge, Pietermaritzburg, South Africa.
 1958: Railway Bridge, Congella, Durban, South Africa.
 1958: Arch Bridge over Vaal River, Standerton, South Africa.

1960s
 1960: Hertzog Boulevard, Cape Town, South Africa.
 1961–1963: Kyle/Lake Mutirikwe and Bangala Dams, Masvingo, Zimbabwe.
 1963: SASOL 1 Chimney, Sasolburg, South Africa.
 1963: Braamfontein Bridge, Johannesburg, South Africa.
 1966: Amatikulu River Bridge, Natal, South Africa.
 1966: Broadway Flyover, Durban, South Africa.
 1967: Sabie Bypass, Mpumalanga, South Africa.
 1967: Reduction Plant, East Driefontein, South Africa.
 1967: Bridle Drift Dam, East London, South Africa.
 1968: Umfolozi River Rail Bridge, KZN, South Africa.
 1968: Arnot Power Station, Cooling Towers, Mpumalanga, South Africa.
 1966–1969: Fox Street Hanging Building, Standard Bank Center, Johannesburg, South Africa. LCB Concortium. o

1970s
 1970s: Phalaborwa Copper Mine development, Limpopo, South Africa.
 1970s–1990s: Multiple Concrete Headgears for various mining clients, Botswana, Zambia and South Africa.
 1970–1973: Naute Dam, ǁKaras Region, Namibia. 
 1971 Ovamboland Canal, Namibia.
 1971 Soweto Motorway, Johannesburg, South Africa.
 1972 Paved aprons, Durban International Airport, South Africa.
 1973 Crown Interchange, Johannesburg, South Africa. 
 1976: Matla Power Station, Concrete slides of ACC and Boiler house lift shafts, Mpumalanga, South Africa. 
 1978: Gouritz River Bridge, 270 m, 4 span structure with diagonal reinforced struts, Eastern Cape, South Africa.

 1978 Tailings Dams, Anglo American, Welkom, South Africa.
 1979 Sulphur Recovery Plant, SASOL 2, Linde, South Africa.
 1979–1981: Sasol 3 steamplant with 300-metre high chimney, South Africa. Chimney and first boiler were commissioned in 1981.

1980s
 1980–1983: Bloukrans River arch-bridge, Eastern Cape, South Africa.
 1980–1984: Steam Plants for Sasol 2 and 3, Secunda, Mpumalanga, South Africa.
 1982: Majes Irrigation Project, Peru,
 1983: Majuba Power Station, Boiler House and ACC concrete slides, main civils, Mpumalanga, South Africa.
 1983: Bobbejaans River Bridge, Eastern Cape, South Africa.
 1984: Hawane Dam, Swaziland.
 1984: Thabina Dam, Limpopo, South Africa.
 1984–1988: 4 Kilometre long road Huguenot Tunnel, Western Cape, South Africa.
 1984–1988: Hugos Valley Viaduct, Western Cape, South Africa.

 1985–1988: Johannesburg Academic Hospital, South Africa. 
 1986: Usutu Pulp Mill, Swaziland.
 1989-1990: American Embassy, Pretoria, South Africa.

1990s
 1993: Pavilion Mall, Durban, South Africa.
 1994: Sanlam Forum Building, C/o Church and Queen Streets, Pretoria, South Africa.
 1998: Injaka Bridge, collapsed during construction, but eventually completed.
 1988 - 1989: Reserve Bank, 37 story skyscraper, first flushed-glazed building in the southern hemisphere, Pretoria, South Africa. 
 1991 - 1992: Wanderers Cricket Stadium rebuild, Johannesburg, South Africa. 
 1988 - 1993: Matimba Power Station, main civils, Lephalale, Limpopo, South Africa.

 1993 - 1996: Katse Dam, Lesotho, JV with Hochtief

 1998: Mozal Aluminium Smelter, Maputo, Mozambique.
 1999: Debswana Orapa Mine Expansion, Francistown, Botswana.

2000s
 2000: Impala Platinum Shaft 14 development, multi-blast ventilation facilities, overland rock conveyor, upgrading of hoisting facilities, surface ore transfer silos, Rustenburg, South Africa. 
 2000 - 2002: National Bank of Dubai, UAE.
 2000: Kutama Sinthumule Correctional Centre, Makhado, South Africa.
 2000: Cape Town and Johannesburg International Airports radar towers. (31 and 54 m each)
 2001: OR Tambo International Airport, Charlie Taxiway, Johannesburg, South Africa.
 2001: Bakwena Platinum Highway, 380 kilometer upgrade of N1 and N4 highways.
 2002-2001: Gold Reef City, main complex, Johannesburg, South Africa.
 2002: Airports Company South Africa (ACSA) Johannesburg International Domestic Terminal, (AC Consortium).
 2002–2004: Katima Mulilo Bridge, between Namibia and Zambia

 2002–2009: Port of Ngqura, Coega, new port construction consisting of: eastern breakwater, 2.7 km in length extending into Algoa Bay to a maximum water depth of 18 metres. A secondary western breakwater 1.125 km in length to a water depth of 15m. Five berths, 1,800m of quay wall – two for containers, two for dry bulk and breakbulk cargo and one for liquid bulk cargo. JV with Hochtief, Port Elizabeth, South Africa. 
 2007—2012: Port of Ngqura, Container Terminal, civil works phase 2, Coega, extension of container terminal and quay walls to make provision for two more ship berths. JV with Hochtief, Port Elizabeth, South Africa.
 2004: World Trade Centre, Manama, Bahrain.
 2005: Lusip Dam, Swaziland.
 2005: Debswana Diamond Sorting Centre, Gaborone, Botswana.
 2005–2007: Durban Harbour Tunnel,  515m service tunnel underneath Durban Harbour entrance. JV with Hochtief, Durban, South Africa.
2006-2008: Sandton Holiday Inn, Johannesburg, South Africa.
 2007-2009: PPC Hercules: Bulk cement and clinker silos.
 2007: Oprah Winfrey Leadership Academy for Girls, Henley on Klip, Gauteng, South Africa. 
 2007–2014: Ingula Power Station, bulk earthworks and civils of Bedford and Braamhoek storage dams, South Africa.
 2008: P.G. Bison Particleboard facility, Uigie, South Africa.
 2008: Sishen Iron Ore Mine Expansion Project, Northern Cape, South Africa.
 2008–2014: Medupi Power Station Chimneys contract. Two way joint venture with Kareena Africa, Limpopo, South Africa.

 2008–2015: Kusile Power Station Chimneys contract. Two way joint venture with Kareena Africa, Mpumalanga, South Africa. 
 2008:Mpumalanga Tourism and Parks Agency Head Office, Halls Gateway, Mbombela, Mpumalanga, South Africa.
 2009:Gathemann/Mutual Tower, 20 story green building, Windhoek, Namibia.
 2009: Vaal River Eastern Subsystem Augmentation Project (Vresap), 121 kilometre water catchment transfer pipeline, Free State to Gauteng, South Africa.

 2009: Bulk Diamond Clearing Centre, Gaborone, Botswana.
 2009: Gateway Mall, Athlone, Cape Town, South Africa. 
 2008-2009: Department of Foreign Affairs, new ministry head office, Pretoria, South Africa.
 2008: British Consulate, Harare, Zimbabwe.
 2008–present: Medupi Power Station Main civils contract. Three way joint venture with Aveng and Murray and Roberts, Limpopo, South Africa.

2010s
 2010: Assmang Ore Heavy Rail Loop, Northern Cape, South Africa.
 2011: Kolomela Mine Expansion Project: 36 km Sishen-Saldanha rail connection.
 2012 Ruacana Power Station, 4th turbine main civils, Namibia.
 2012: City Deep Container Terminal, Johannesburg, South Africa.
 2012: Lanseria Bulk-water Reservoir, Johannesburg, South Africa.

 2012–2014: Portside Building. 5 Star Green Building, Cape Town, South Africa.
 2012: Lanseria Reservoir, Johannesburg, South Africa. 
 2013: Driefontein Waste Water Treatment Works, Johannesburg, South Africa.
 2013 - 2014: The Grove Mall, Windhoek, Namibia.
 2014: 102 Rivonia. 4 Star Green Building, Sandton, South Africa.
 2014: Al Raha beach luxury apartments, Abu Dhabi, UAE.
 2014: Lesedi Solar Power Station, Bulk earthworks and civils, South Africa.
 2014: GCIS Tshedimosetso House, 4 Star Green Building, Pretoria, South Africa.
 2014: Venetia Diamond Mine, underground development, Limpopo, South Africa.
 2014–2015: Jeffreys Bay Wind Farm, Eastern Cape, South Africa.

 2014: N4 Middleburg Highway upgrade, Mpumalanga, South Africa.
 2014: Baywest Mall, Port Elizabeth, South Africa.
 2015–2017: Grayston Pedestrian and Cycle Bridge
 2015–present: Mogalakwena Tailings Facility, Northern Limpopo, South Africa.
 2015–2016: De Aar Wind Farm, Northern Cape, South Africa.
 2016: Tsogo Sun Hotel, Western Cape, South Africa.
 2016–2017: Menlyn Park Mall Rebuild. 4 Star Green Building, biggest mall by lettable floor space in South Africa,
 2016–2017: R72 Highway between Port Alfred and Fish River, Eastern Cape, South Africa. 

 2016–2017: BCX Centurion. Green Building, Pretoria, South Africa.
 2016–2017: Century City Urban Square, 4 Star Green Building, Cape Town, South Africa.
 2016–2017: Embassy Towers, Sandton, South Africa.
 2017-2018: Skukuza Safari Lodge, Kruger National Park, South Africa.
 2017: Radisson Blu Hotel Cape Town, South Africa.
 2017–2019: Khobab Wind Farm, Northern Cape, South Africa.
 2017–present: Belfast Coal Mine, Middelbug, South Africa. Construction of 4 major dams, 26 concrete platforms and terraces, 37 internal roads, and upgrade of adjacent provincial roads 
 2017–present: Mtunzini National Road Upgrade, Kwa-Zulu Natal, South Africa.
 2017–present: Load and Haul, Zwartfontein Pit, Mogalakwena Platinum Mine, Limpopo, South Africa.
 2018–2020: 16 on Bree, Tallest residential building in Cape Town, South Africa.
 2018–present: Kangans Wind Farm, 140 MW situated 52 km east of Springbok, Northern Cape, South Africa.
 2018–2019: Perdekraal Wind Farm, 110 MW 80 km northeast of Ceres, Western Cape, South Africa.
 2018–2020: Golden Valley Wind Farm, 120 MW, near the town of Bedford, Eastern Cape, South Africa.
 2019–present: Msikaba Bridge, 580m cable-stay main span bridge, near Lusikisiki, Eastern Cape, South Africa.
 2019–2021: Roggeveld Wind Farm, 147 MW near Laingsburg, Northern Cape, South Africa.

2020s
 2020: Excelsior Wind Farm, Western Cape, South Africa.
 2020-2021: MeerKAT Extension Project, Carnavon, Northern Cape, South Africa.
 2020-2022: Oxford Parks Multi 5 and 6 star Green Building precinct, Dunkeld, South Africa.
 2022: Ikusasa, 6 Star Green Building, Rosebank, South Africa.
 2023: Phezokumoya Wind Farm, Eastern Cape, South Africa.
 2023: Sankraal Wind Farm, Eastern Cape, South Africa.

Gallery of other projects involving Concor

References

Construction and civil engineering companies of South Africa
Companies based in Johannesburg
Construction and civil engineering companies established in 1948
South African companies established in 1948